Thomas Rathgeber (born 30 April 1985 in Kempten, West Germany) is a German soccer player who plays for FC Kempten.

Career statistics

Club

References

External links
 
 Thomas Rathgeber at FuPa

1985 births
Living people
German footballers
VfL Bochum players
VfL Bochum II players
SpVgg Unterhaching players
Kickers Offenbach players
1. FC Saarbrücken players
SpVgg Unterhaching II players
FC Schalke 04 II players
SSV Ulm 1846 players
Bundesliga players
2. Bundesliga players
3. Liga players
Regionalliga players
Association football forwards
People from Kempten im Allgäu
Sportspeople from Swabia (Bavaria)
Footballers from Bavaria